Dorzhi Banzarov (c. 1822–1855) was a Buryat Orientalist and linguist, notable for being the first person of non-ethnic Russian descent to receive a Ph.D. at a Russian university. He is generally considered to be the first Buryat academic.

Biography

Banzarov was born to a  peasant family in Dede-Ichyotuy in March 1822 in the modern-day Dzhidinsky District. Besides Dorzhi, there were four other sons in the family — Lochon, Badma, Dzonduy, and Kharagshan — two of whom would go on to become Lamas. His father, Banzar Borgonov, was an officer of the former  regiment, and followed the Buddhist faith.

In 1842 he entered Kazan University, where he studied under Józef Kowalewski and began to specialize in Oriental studies.

Banzarov was reported to have an almost prodigious aptitude for languages. Besides his native Buryat and Russian languages, he was reported to have studied Manchu, Kalmyk, Tibetan, Sanskrit and Turkish, and to have a good understanding of English, Latin, French and German.

While studying in the university, he began to translate foreign works into the Mongolian language, such as The Travels of Faxian, The Travels of Tulišen, and the 16th century Kalmyk work .

Black Faith, or, Shamanism with the Mongols
He received his Ph.D. in 1846 with the paper Black Faith or Shamanism with the Mongols.

In Black Faith, Banzarov brought forth the idea that Mongolian shamanism was a sophisticated belief system with unique origins, and not an offshoot of Buddhism, Christianity, or any other major religion.

Later life
Due to his Cossack origins, however, he was obligated to begin service to the nation for 25 years as soon as he graduated. He left for St Petersburg to present his case to the Governing Senate, who decreed in 1850 that he should relocate to Irkutsk to work for the Irkutsk Governorate.

In the meantime, Banzarov spent 1847-1849 working in the Asiatic Museum of St Petersburg. One of his prominent works at the Museum was to translate the writing on the Stele of Genghis Khan.

He died in 1855. The ethnographer  claimed that Banzarov had drunk himself to death. The circumstances surrounding his death are unclear, but there seems to be a general consensus that deep despair and the nonfulfillment of his potential as a researcher and intellectual were contributing factors to his death.

Legacy

In 1947, the Buryat State University was named after him, in honor of the 125th year of his birth. A street in Ulan-Ude, the capital of Buryatia, was also renamed from "Buryatskaya Street" to "Dorzhi Banzarov Street." For unknown reasons in the 1990s, the university shifted to simply "Buryat State University" and only in 2019 did it again receive the name "Dorzhi Banzarov Buryat State University".

He is an important figure for the Buryat people as one of the first Buryat intellectuals to gain mass acclaim in Russia and for building the academic field of Mongolian studies in Russia, and for being amongst the first members of the colonized peoples of Siberia to rise to the level of an academic career. The beginnings of the Buryat intelligentsia are said to begin with him and another Buryat academic, .

A statue of him was installed in June 2010 in Dzhidinsky District to celebrate the 75th anniversary of the founding of the district. The sculptor was the Buryat . There is also a statue of him in Ulan-Ude, and a memorial to him at the Kazan University, installed in October 2020.

References

Buryat people
1822 births
1855 deaths
Kazan Federal University alumni